Pitambara Sidhanta Vagisa (1530-1620) was 16th century litterateur from Kamrup and contemporary of likes of Damodara Mishra.

Works
Smriti writers Pitambara Siddhanta Vagisa, Damodar Misra and others developed what may be called a Kamarupa school of Smritis. It was royal patronage that helped in the dissemination of Sanskrit learning and culture.

See also
 Ananta Kandali
 Bhusana Dvija

References

Kamrupi literary figures
15th-century Indian writers
16th-century Indian writers
1455 births
1533 deaths
Writers from Assam